The 900 is a 2½-revolution (900 degrees) aerial spin performed on a skateboard ramp. While airborne, the skateboarder makes two-and-a-half turns about their longitudinal axis, thereby facing down when coming down. It is considered one of skateboarding's most technically demanding tricks.

Performance by Tony Hawk
Tony Hawk, one of the most successful vertical pro skateboarders in the world, landed the 900 at X Games V in 1999 after ten failed attempts.  It was past regulation time but, as one announcer said, "We make up the rules as we go along. Let's give him another try." Other skaters protested, but Hawk continued. Hawk twice landed on his board, but it flew out from under him. When he finally completed the trick, his arms windmilled and his hand barely grazed the ramp. Nonetheless, he rode away.

In his book, the 900 was the last on the wishlist of tricks Hawk had written a decade earlier. Other tricks on the list included the ollie 540, kickflip 540, and varial 720. In a 1999 interview, Hawk said he does not have "any desire to spin further." He successfully landed the trick during press interviews for the video game Tony Hawk: Ride and at the "Tony Hawk: RIDE Presents Stand Up for Skate Parks" event. In 2011, Hawk was still able to land the 900, and posted a video of the trick via his Twitter account, stating, "I'm 43 and I did a 900 today." On June 27, 2016, Hawk was again successful.

Pre-Hawk
A number of opinions exist about pre-1999 900s. The most prominent of these is the argument that Danny Way landed the 900 in 1989, and it appears in an early Santa Cruz film. In 1999, Tony Hawk said:

Successful landings

On vert ramp
 Tony Hawk, June 27, 1999, X Games V, San Francisco, California, USA
 Giorgio Zattoni, April 2004, Marianna HC, Ravenna, Italy
 Sandro Dias, May 2004, Latin X-Games, Rio de Janeiro, Brazil
 Alex Perelson, July 2009, Maloof Money Cup, Costa Mesa, California, USA
 Elliot Sloan, October 2, 2011, first tailgrab 900, Maloof Money Cup, South Africa
 Zac Rose, April 2012 at Rye Airfield, New Hampshire, USA
 Tas Pappas, April 2014, at Megaranch, Melbourne, Australia
 Asher Bradshaw, May 23, 2014, on vert at Woodward West in Tehachapi, California at the age of 10

In May 2020, 11 year-old Brazilian Gui Khury became the first person to land a 1080 using only a vert ramp.

On mega ramp (Big air)
 Bob Burnquist, September 4, 2010, first fakie-to-fakie indy 900 and first 900 on a mega ramp, Vista, California, USA
 Mitchie Brusco, July 2011, Nescau MegaRamp Invitational, São Paulo, Brazil
 Tom Schaar, October 2011, on mega ramp at Woodward West in Tehachapi, California, USA
 Jonathan Schwan, April 2013, on mega ramp at Woodward West in Tehachapi, California, USA

In 2012, Tom Schaar landed a 1080 on his fifth attempt on the mega ramp.

In August 2019, Mitchie Brusco became the first person to land a 1260 (three full and one-half revolutions) in a Big Air competition at X Games Minneapolis.

Other sports
The 900 can also be attempted on a BMX bike, skis, snowboard, inline skates or a scooter. BMX rider Mat Hoffman was the first person to successfully land the 900 on film at a competition in Canada in 1989.  In 2002 at X Games VIII, Hoffman took the trick a step further by landing a no-handed 900. BMX rider Simon Tabron's signature trick is the 900. In the 2007 at X Games XIII, Simon Tabron landed the first back-to-back 900s on a bike.

Because the gear of snowboarders, skiers, and inline skaters is affixed to their feet, the 900 is not considered to be a difficult trick for professionals in those sports and is performed comparatively often. 1620 and 1800 degree spins have been landed on skis, a 1620 has been performed on a snowboard as well as on inline skates, 1080 on BMX, 1080 on scooter.

References 

Skateboarding tricks